The 1977 Italian Grand Prix was a Formula One motor race held at Monza on September 11, 1977.

Qualifying

Qualifying classification

Race

Report 
The fact that it was Ferrari's home race did not deter James Hunt who took pole, whereas Carlos Reutemann cheered the home fans by starting second in front of Jody Scheckter. Scheckter took the lead after a brilliant start, and in second place was Clay Regazzoni's Ensign who got an even better one. Regazzoni however did not have the pace and soon dropped down the order, whereas Mario Andretti was on the move, passing Hunt on the second lap, and Scheckter a few laps later to take the lead. Hunt dropped back with brake troubles as the race progressed, and Scheckter retired when his engine failed, leaving Reutemann and Niki Lauda in second and third. Lauda was soon past Reutemann, and the latter had to retire when he spun off on oil on the track left by the car of debutant Bruno Giacomelli, handing third to Alan Jones. The race finished in that order; with Andretti taking a dominant victory from Lauda, who closed in on the championship, and Jones who took his second podium in three races. By finishing 2nd, Ferrari won the Constructor's Championship with three races left.

Classification

Championship standings after the race

Drivers' Championship standings

Constructors' Championship standings

Note: Only the top five positions are included for both sets of standings. Only the best 8 results from the first 9 races and the best 7 results from the remaining 8 races were retained. Numbers without parentheses are retained points; numbers in parentheses are total points scored.

References

Italian Grand Prix
Italian Grand Prix
Grand Prix
Italian Grand Prix